Przyborów  is a village in the administrative district of Gmina Czarna, within Dębica County, Subcarpathian Voivodeship, in south-eastern Poland.

References

Villages in Dębica County